Petter Villegas (born November 15, 1975 in Esmeraldas) is an Ecuadorian-born Puerto Rican footballer who played for Puerto Rico Islanders in the North American Soccer League.

Career

Youth and college
Villegas came to the United States with his family as a child, settling in Newark, New Jersey. He attended Saint Benedict's Preparatory School, where he was a three-time New Jersey All State high school player, scoring 34 goals, assisted on 18 more in 1993. In 1999, he was named by The Star-Ledger as one of the top ten New Jersey high school soccer players of the 1990s.

He played one year of college soccer at Kean College, earning first team All-NJAC honors in 1995, before turning professional.

Professional
Villegas' first taste of Major League Soccer action came in 1996, when he played three games for the MetroStars on loan from the New Jersey Stallions of the USISL. Three years in the minors followed, until the Metros drafted Villegas in the first round of the 1999 MLS Supplemental Draft. He played the next four and a half seasons for the Metros, mostly as a right midfielder, but also as a forward and defender.  Villegas' erratic play matched his versatility – brilliant one moment, awful the next – earning him the sarcastic nickname The Greatest Metro Ever. Despite his inconsistency, he scored a number of key goals, including an overtime game winner in a comeback against the Tampa Bay Mutiny in 2000. Overall, Villegas scored 13 goals and 21 assists in his Metro career, adding two goals and two assists in the playoffs.

On May 10, 2002, the MetroStars traded Villegas and defender Orlando Perez to D.C. United for Craig Ziadie and Mark Lisi. At the time of the trade, Villegas had started all seven MetroStars' games that season. He spent the rest of the year with D.C., scoring two goals and adding five assists. Villegas left MLS afterwards, going back to his native Ecuador to play for Aucas, Barcelona SC, Manta and Deportivo Cuenca. In 2005, he came back to the United States, signing with the Puerto Rico Islanders of the USL First Division. He continued with the Puerto Rico Islanders until the end of the 2009 season.

Villegas signed with River Plate Puerto Rico of the USL for the 2011 season, but played just three games before the team was removed from USL Pro due to financial difficulties. He moved back to the Islanders in the North American Soccer League in June. His contract was not renewed at the end of the season.

International
In 2008, having been a resident of Puerto Rico for three years, Villegas made his debut with the Puerto Rican national team, scoring a goal against the Dominican Republic, which enabled Puerto Rico to advance to the next stage of the 2010 FIFA World Cup qualification.

Honors

Club

Puerto Rico Islanders
 USL First Division Championship runners-up: 2008
 Commissioner's Cup: 2008
 CFU Club Championship runner-up: 2009

References

External links
 Puerto Rico Islanders bio
 

1975 births
Living people
Sportspeople from Esmeraldas, Ecuador
St. Benedict's Preparatory School alumni
Soccer players from Newark, New Jersey
Ecuadorian footballers
Puerto Rican footballers
Parade High School All-Americans (boys' soccer)
New Jersey Stallions players
New York Red Bulls players
D.C. United players
S.D. Aucas footballers
Barcelona S.C. footballers
Manta F.C. footballers
C.D. Cuenca footballers
Puerto Rico Islanders players
Club Atlético River Plate Puerto Rico players
USISL Select League players
USL First Division players
Major League Soccer players
USL Championship players
North American Soccer League players
Expatriate soccer players in the United States
USL Second Division players
New York Red Bulls draft picks
Association football forwards
Association football midfielders
Puerto Rico international footballers